Altay Bayındır  born 14 April 1998) is a Turkish professional footballer who plays as a goalkeeper for Fenerbahçe and the Turkey national team.

Club career
Bayındır made his Süper Lig debut with MKE Ankaragücü against Çaykur Rizespor on 30 November 2018 which ended 1–1.

On 8 July 2019, Bayındır joined Fenerbahçe on a four-year contract. Bayındır became the first-choice goalkeeper, following a performance contention with team fellow Harun Tekin. On 19 August 2019, he played his Fenerbahçe debut against Gazişehir Gaziantep F.K. that ended 5–0 for Fenerbahçe at Şükrü Saracoğlu Stadium.

On 3 October 2020, Bayındır saved a penalty shot by Erik Sabo, at week 4 encounter against Fatih Karagümrük, ended 2–1 for Fenerbahçe. On 6 December 2020, he saved another penalty shot from Radosław Murawski, at week 11 encounter against Denizlispor which Fenerbahçe won 2–0. He produced total of 7 saves during this game in which Fenerbahçe were down to 10-men following the ruling-out of Serdar Aziz.

On 30 October 2021, in a 2–1 away defeat to Konyaspor, Bayındır collided with Serdar Gürler in the 69th minute, was injured and left the field, being replaced by Berke Özer. The following day, Fenerbahçe made an announcement, saying “Although no fracture was detected in Altay Bayındır’s shoulder, acromioclavicular separation was observed. It was decided that our player would have an operation and his treatment was started.”. It was expected that he would approximately be out of the field for 3 months.

On 18 March 2023, he extended his contract, which would expire at the end of the season, until 2027.

International career

Youth
Bayındır represented the Turkey U-20s at the 2018 Toulon Tournament.

Senior
Bayındır was invited to Turkey by Şenol Güneş, for UEFA Nations League encounters against Hungary and Russia, on 9 November 2020. He made his debut on 27 May 2021 in a friendly against Azerbaijan.

Personal life 
Bayındır has been born in Osmangazi in 1998 to a family of Abkhaz-Circassian origin. He is a Muslim.

Career statistics

Club

International

References

External links
 Profile at the Fenerbahçe S.K. website
 
 
 

1998 births
Living people
People from Osmangazi
Turkish footballers
Turkey youth international footballers
Turkey under-21 international footballers
Turkey international footballers
Turkish people of Abkhazian descent
MKE Ankaragücü footballers
Fenerbahçe S.K. footballers
Süper Lig players
TFF First League players
TFF Second League players
Association football goalkeepers
UEFA Euro 2020 players